Physalaemus aguirrei is a species of frog in the family Leptodactylidae. It is endemic to eastern Brazil and occurs in the southern Bahia, northern Espírito Santo and northeastern Minas Gerais. The specific name aguirrei honours Alvaro Coutinho Aguirre, a Brazilian zoologist. However, common name Linhares dwarf frog has been proposed for it.

Habitat and conservation
It breeds using foam nests in temporary ponds. It is a common species that probably suffers from habitat loss caused by intensive agriculture, wood plantations, livestock grazing, clear-cutting, and human settlement. It is present in several protected areas.

References

aguirrei
Amphibians of Brazil
Endemic fauna of Brazil
Amphibians described in 1966
Taxonomy articles created by Polbot